Exit is the fourth studio album by Finnish grindcore band Rotten Sound, released on 5 January 2005.

Track listing

Personnel
Keijo Niinimaa – vocals
Mika Aalto – guitars
Toni Pihlaja – bass
Kai Hahto – drums

Additional personnel
Mieszko Talarczyk – production, recording, mixing, mastering
Håkan Åkesson – mastering

Charts

Release history

References

2005 albums
Rotten Sound albums
Spinefarm Records albums
Willowtip Records albums